PT Smartfren Telecom Tbk, commonly known as Smartfren (stylized as smartfren.), formerly known as PT Mobile 8 Telecom Tbk, is an Indonesia-based wireless network operator headquartered in Central Jakarta. It is owned by Indonesian conglomerate Sinar Mas under the company PT Sinar Mas Komunikasi Teknologi. Smartfren operates exclusively using a 4G LTE network after shifting away from CDMA technologies in 2014. As of 2018, Smartfren has 10.1 million active subscribers, making them the fifth-largest wireless carrier in the country.

Smartfren provides wireless voice (via VoLTE) and data services in Indonesia, which it claims is available in over 200 cities. In 2015, the company launched their LTE-Advanced network, becoming the first in the country to do so.

Andromax
Smartfren has partnered with some China-based smartphone manufacturers such as Hisense, Haier and ZTE to produce smart devices under the Smartfren Andromax brand. These phones operate on either CDMA 2000 1x or LTE on the newer models. They use the following naming scheme:

C and G models denote lower-end smartphone models
I and T models denote lower to midrange models
U, V and Z models denote mid to high-end smartphones.

More recently they have also launched the E, Q and R models which has LTE capability; and the E2 and R2 models which supports VoLTE.

Slogans

As Smart Telecom
 Smart, Hebat, Hemat (2006-2011)

As Mobile-8 Telecom

Fren
 Kartu Selularku (2003-2006)
 Seluler Pilihan Cerdas (2006-2008)
 Murah, Tidak Repot. (2008-2009)
 hemat, Tidak Repot. (2009-2011)

Esia
Untung Pakai Esia

Hepi
 Pasti Lebih Untung (2008-2010)

As Smartfren
 Live Smart (2011-2018)
 4G Go For It (2015-2018, After Smartfren Launch Andromax 4G LTE)
 Hebat, Hemat, Cepat (2018-present)
 Juaranya Internet Unlimited (2018-present)

References

External links
Official websites:
 Indonesian
 English

Indonesian brands
Indonesian companies established in 2002
Mobile phone companies of Indonesia
Companies listed on the Indonesia Stock Exchange
Sinar Mas Group
Telecommunications companies established in 2002
Telecommunications companies of Indonesia
2006 initial public offerings